Melanostomias is a genus of barbeled dragonfishes.

Species
There are currently 16 recognized species in this genus:
 Melanostomias bartonbeani A. E. Parr, 1927 (Scaleless black dragonfish)
 Melanostomias biseriatus Regan & Trewavas, 1930
 Melanostomias globulifer Fowler, 1934 (Brightchin dragonfish)
 Melanostomias macrophotus Regan & Trewavas, 1930
 Melanostomias margaritifer Regan & Trewavas, 1930
 Melanostomias melanopogon Regan & Trewavas, 1930
 Melanostomias melanops A. B. Brauer, 1902
 Melanostomias niger Gilchrist & von Bonde, 1924 (Fangtooth dragonfish)
 Melanostomias nigroaxialis Parin & Pokhil'skaya, 1978
 Melanostomias paucilaternatus Parin & Pokhil'skaya, 1978 (Spothead dragonfish)
 Melanostomias pauciradius Matsubara, 1938 (Three-ray dragonfish)
 Melanostomias pollicifer Parin & Pokhil'skaya, 1978
 Melanostomias stewarti Fowler, 1934
 Melanostomias tentaculatus (Regan & Trewavas, 1930) (Tentacle dragonfish)
 Melanostomias valdiviae A. B. Brauer, 1902 (Valdivia black dragonfish)
 Melanostomias vierecki Fowler, 1934

References

Stomiidae
Taxa named by August Brauer
Marine fish genera
Ray-finned fish genera